B&H Airlines d.o.o. was the flag carrier of Bosnia and Herzegovina with its head office in Sarajevo. It operated scheduled and charter passenger services as well as small cargo services from its home base at Sarajevo International Airport. It ceased operating in June 2015

History

Early years

The airline was founded on 12 August 1994 as Air Bosna. In the autumn of 2003, the airline ceased operations due to inability to repay its debt. It remained defunct until May 2004, when the Government of the Federation of Bosnia and Herzegovina promised to revive it. In June 2005, it restarted operations as B&H Airlines, operating a pair of ATR-72 aircraft.

In late 2007, the Bosnian government announced it was to sell shares in B&H Airlines. On 23 February 2008, it was reported that Turkish Airlines was in negotiations to buy the airline, and on 30 March 2008, Croatia Airlines was also interested in a stake. The government of the Federation of Bosnia and Herzegovina also invited Comintel and MyAir (in addition to Turkish Airlines and Croatia Airlines) to recapitalise the airline.

Bids were received from Turkish Airlines, Malaysia's Comintel Corporation and a Jordanian consortium, which included Royal Jordanian. On 29 October 2008, the Bosnian government announced that Turkish Airlines had been picked as the best bidder in an auction for B&H Airlines shares. Turkish Airlines proposed to sub-lease B&H Airlines two Boeing aircraft, if requested by the airline, and in return for 49% of the shares of the company, covered the lease payments of the Boeing aircraft and participated in capital increase decisions. However, in June 2012, Turkish Airlines ended the joint venture following which the government of Bosnia and Herzegovina gave the airline a cash injection of €3.5 million.

Developments since 2012
As of mid-2012, the airline was jointly owned by the government of the Federation of Bosnia and Herzegovina (99.93%) and Energoinvest (0.07%), after the government's purchase of a former joint stake by Turkish Airlines (49%). In April 2013, the airline had to cancel flights when its only airworthy ATR 72 aircraft was withdrawn for maintenance. Its other ATR 72 had been previously grounded for similar maintenance.

In June 2015, the Federation government of Bosnia and Herzegovina decided to liquidate the carrier. The Federal Minister for Transport and Communication, Denis Lasić, said that the best option would be for the airline to declare bankruptcy. "They [B&H Airlines] have eaten up everything they had and now they are in a situation where they must redirect all state funding to HETA". B&H has some eight million euros worth of debt owed to HETA, the asset management company, for the financial lease of its two ATR 72s. The Minister added, "I have held talks with the Prime Minister Fadil Novalić and the conclusion is to liquidate the carrier." B&H Airlines owed the airport of Sarajevo over 3,5 million Euros and the lessor of their aircraft over 7,5 million Euros. The total debt was over 17 million US-Dollars at the time of closure.

The airline flew its last commercial service on 11 June 2015. The company's Air operator's certificate was revoked on 2 July 2015.

Destinations
, B&H Airlines operated scheduled flights to the following destinations:

Bosnia and Herzegowina
 Sarajevo - Sarajevo International Airport base
 Banja Luka - Banja Luka International Airport

Switzerland
 Zürich - Zürich Airport

Fleet

As of the time of closure, the B&H Airlines fleet consisted of one ATR 72–212 seating 66 passengers.

Historic fleet

Previously, B&H Airlines operated the following aircraft:
 Airbus A319-100
 ATR 42
 Boeing 737-200
 Boeing 737-400
 CASA C-212 Aviocar
 Fokker 50
 McDonnell Douglas MD-80
 Yakovlev Yak-42

Statistics

See also
 Sarajevo International Airport
 Banja Luka International Airport
 List of airports in Bosnia and Herzegovina
 Turkish Airlines

References

External links

 Official website (archive)

Defunct airlines of Bosnia and Herzegovina
Airlines established in 2005
Airlines disestablished in 2015
2005 establishments in Bosnia and Herzegovina
2015 disestablishments in Bosnia and Herzegovina